Canto de amor is a 1940 Argentine romantic musical drama film, directed and written by Julio Irigoyen. It is based on a tango with music by Osvaldo Fresedo.
Carlitos Viván and Tino Tori, known for his comic Filomeno Chichipío persona, made appearances opposite Nelly Omar.

It is believed that all copies of the film were destroyed; however, the Argentine film archive at the Museo del Cine Pablo Ducrós Hicken preserves photographs taken in the filming set.

Cast
 Nelly Omar
 Carlitos Viván (Carlos Vivan)
 Herminia Velich
 Tino Tori
 Warly Ceriani

References

External links
 

1940 films
1940s Spanish-language films
Argentine black-and-white films
1940s musical drama films
Films directed by Julio Irigoyen
Lost Argentine films
1940s romantic musical films
Argentine romantic drama films
Argentine musical drama films
Argentine romantic musical films
1940 romantic drama films
1940s Argentine films